Dark Mirror is a 1984 American TV movie. It was a remake of a 1946 film.

Cast
Jane Seymour as Leigh; Tracy
Stephen Collins as Dr Jim Eiseley
Vincent Gardenia as Detective Al Church
Hank Brandt as Girard
Ty Henderson as Wittman
Jack Kruschen as Smithson
Bill Quinn as Mr Bennett
Cathleen Cordell as Mrs Bennett
Robert DoQui as Higgens
Reid Cruickshanks as Avery
Sandy Freeman as Dorothy Francis
Patti Been as Policewoman

Production
Filming took place in September 1983. Seymour read the first draft, then saw the original film. She asked why they did not simply remake that, and the film was rewritten.

"It was the perfect role," Seymour said later, "giving me the chance to play it sweetly and then be nasty and vicious at the same time."

References

External links
Dark Mirror at IMDb
Review at New York Times
Dark Mirror at BFI
Dark Mirror at TCMDB

1984 television films
1984 films
Films directed by Richard Lang (director)